Ali Ravcı (born 1 January 1973) is a Turkish football manager and former player.

References

1973 births
Living people
Turkish footballers
Turkey under-21 international footballers
Süper Lig players
Association football midfielders
Malatyaspor footballers
Balıkesirspor footballers
Sarıyer S.K. footballers
Gaziantepspor footballers
Zonguldakspor footballers
Vanspor footballers
Kayserispor footballers
Mersin İdman Yurdu footballers
Siirtspor footballers
Yimpaş Yozgatspor footballers
Turkish football managers
Diyarbakırspor managers